The 1949 Cincinnati Bearcats football team was an American football team that represented the University of Cincinnati as a member of the Mid-American Conference (MAC) during the 1949 college football season. The Bearcats were led by first-year head coach Sid Gillman and compiled a 7–4 record and were named MAC champions. The Bearcats would win against Toledo in the Glass Bowl.

Schedule

References

Cincinnati
Cincinnati Bearcats football seasons
Mid-American Conference football champion seasons
Cincinnati Bearcats football